Micrixalus gadgili is a species of frog in the family Micrixalidae.
It is endemic to the southern Western Ghats, India.

Its natural habitats are tropical moist lowland forests and rivers.
It is threatened by habitat loss.

References

gadgili
Frogs of India
Endemic fauna of the Western Ghats
Amphibians described in 1990
Taxonomy articles created by Polbot